Chippendale is a small inner-city suburb of Sydney, New South Wales, Australia on the southern edge of the Sydney central business district, in the local government area of the City of Sydney. Chippendale is located between Broadway to the north and Cleveland Street to the south, Sydney Central railway station to the east and the University of Sydney to the west.

History
The area was first occupied by the Gadigal people of the Dharug Nation. William Chippendale was granted a  estate in 1819. It stretched to the present day site of Redfern railway station. Chippendale sold the estate to Solomon Levey, emancipist and merchant, in 1821, for 380 pounds. Solomon Levey died while in London, in 1833.

Chippendale has a number of heritage-listed sites, including the Regent Street railway station or 'Mortuary Station', located on the eastern side of the suburb. The John Storey Memorial Dispensary was built in 1926 as a memorial to John Storey, a former Premier of New South Wales. It is located on Regent Street and still functions as a pathology and methadone clinic.

Commercial area
The eastern side of Chippendale, being adjacent to the CBD, has a greater mix use than other parts of the suburb. It includes smaller offices and warehouses as well as cafes and pubs. Transport New South Wales has its headquarters here.

The western side of Chippendale is mainly residential with businesses interspersed in some parts of the precinct.

Central Park, Sydney
The 168-year-old Carlton & United brewery closed in December 2006. The Frasers Property Australia purchased the brewery site from the Foster's Group in 2007 and lodged a plan for a major renewal project of the  site. The development proposal "Central Park" included approximately 255,000 m2 of commercial and residential space, retention of a number of heritage buildings and the development of a large new park called Chippendale Green. One Central Park is a large mixed-use residential and commercial building on the site.

Balfour Street Park, at the corner of Balfour and O'Connor Streets, acts as a pedestrian gateway to Central Park. Chippendale has the lowest open space per person of any Sydney suburb (City of Sydney open space study, 2006). The addition of Chippendale Green has provided much needed green space; however, given the corresponding population increase from new developments, Chippendale now has less than 1 square metre of green space per resident.

Urban heat island problem
Chippendale is currently a suburb under study, examining the problems of the urban heat island effect. The bitumen-surfaced roads surrounding infrastructures are reportedly driving temperatures  higher than normal.

Schools
The University of Notre Dame Australia sits along the northern border with campus buildings scattered through the suburb. The University of Technology, Sydney and the University of Sydney have campuses nearby. The Sydney campus of Curtin University is located at the eastern edge of Chippendale on Regent Street. The Boston University Sydney Campus is located on Regent Street in Chippendale.

Culture
Chippendale has become known as one of the key creative art districts of Sydney with more than a dozen galleries in the small neighbourhood (including White Rabbit Gallery, MOP Projects, and Pine Street Creative Arts Centre).  Various creative events in the suburb also take place each year such as the Beams Festival.  Artist residencies were offered with the cooperation of Frasers during the construction of Central Park and Chippendale houses a lively creative community.

Population

Demographics
The demographics of Chippendale changed significantly since the development of Central Park. At the 2021 census there were 7,803 people living in Chippendale.

At the  there were 8,617 residents in Chippendale. 26.7% of people were born in China. The most common other countries of birth were Australia 20.9%, Indonesia 5.3%, Thailand 3.6%, Hong Kong 2.3% and England 2.3%. 29.4% of people only spoke English at home. Other languages spoken at home included Mandarin 26.4%, Cantonese 5.5%, Indonesian 4.7%, Thai 3.4% and Vietnamese 1.8%.  The most common religious affiliation was "No Religion" 50.3%, followed by Buddhism 10.0%, Catholic 9.7% and Anglican 2.5%.

The 2016 census continued to show that the majority of people in Chippendale were attending an educational institution (58.2%). Of these, 67.3% were in a tertiary or technical institution.

Notable residents
 William Chippendale, Sydney land owner and farmer whose surname the suburb's name is derived from
 David Malouf, writer
 Michael Mobbs, author of Sustainable House

Gallery

References

Further reading
 Shirley Fitzgerald. CHIPPENDALE - Beneath The Factory Wall. Published by Halstead Press, Australia. 2008..

External links 

  [CC-By-SA]